Granby Township may refer to the following townships in the United States:

 Granby Township, Nicollet County, Minnesota
 Granby Township, Newton County, Missouri

See also
 Granby (disambiguation)

Township name disambiguation pages